Un prêté pour un rendu (une bonne farce avec ma tête), sold in the United States as Tit for Tat, or a Good Joke With My Head and in Britain as "Tit for Tat"—The head in a case, is a 1904 French short silent film by Georges Méliès. It was sold by Méliès's Star Film Company and is numbered 540–541 in its catalogues.

Méliès plays the magician in the film, one of several in his oeuvre involving multiplied heads. The special effects are created with substitution splices and multiple exposures.

A paper print of the film survives at the Library of Congress.

References

External links
 

French black-and-white films
Films directed by Georges Méliès
French silent short films